Tirio ( Makayam [Makaeyam] and Aturu [Adulu, Atura]) is Papuan language of Western Province, Papua New Guinea. The Giribam 'dialect' may be a distinct language.

Makayam is spoken in Aduru, Lewada, Suame, and Sumogi Island villages of Gogodala Rural LLG. The Giribam dialect is spoken in Janor village of Oriomo-Bituri Rural LLG.

Pronouns
Pronouns are:
{|
! !!sg!!pl
|-
!1
|no-gao||gai-ga
|-
!2
|o-gao||zo-gao
|-
!3
|igi||i-ga
|}

No-, o-, zo-, i- may reflect proto-Trans–New Guinea *na, *ga, *ja, *i.

References

Languages of Western Province (Papua New Guinea)
Tirio languages